The Girls U16 Amateur Championship is a golf tournament for girls under 16 which is held annually in the United Kingdom. The competition is organised and run by The R&A.

History
In 2018 the tournament replaced the Ladies' British Open Amateur Stroke Play Championship which was discontinued by The R&A in 2017 following the Ladies' Golf Union merger. It had been played since 1969.

The inaugural championship took place at Fulford Golf Club near York in 2018, the venue that also hosted the inaugural Women's British Open in 1976.

Format
The championship consists of 54 holes of stroke play, played over three days with no cut, contested by a field of 90 players. Entry is open to female golfers who are under 16 years of age on 1 January in the year of the championship.

Results

Source:

Future venues
2023- Enville Golf Club

See also
The Womens Amateur Championship – The Ladies' British Open Amateur Championship held since 1893
Ladies' British Open Amateur Stroke Play Championship – The predecessor tournament held 1969–2017

References

External links

R&A championships
Women's golf in the United Kingdom
Amateur golf tournaments in the United Kingdom
Junior golf tournaments
Youth sport in the United Kingdom
2018 establishments in the United Kingdom
Recurring sporting events established in 2018